Rifkin's Festival is a 2020 comedy film, written and directed by Woody Allen. An American-Spanish-Italian co-production, it stars Wallace Shawn, Elena Anaya, Louis Garrel, Gina Gershon, Sergi López, and Christoph Waltz. It premiered at the 68th San Sebastián International Film Festival on September 18, 2020, and was released in Spain on October 2, 2020, by Tripictures. A short plot summary appeared in The Guardian on September 4, 2019, stating: "The movie, Rifkin’s Festival, is about a couple who fall in love while in town for the San Sebastián film festival, drawing on the annual event as the backdrop to a romantic comedy."

On January 28, 2022, the film began a limited release in United States theaters and on streaming services.

Plot 

Mort Rifkin, a snobby elderly film critic from New York, is telling his therapist about the recent developments in his life. In the recount, he's accompanying his much younger wife Sue to a film festival in San Sebastián. She works as a press agent for Philippe, a French director whose banal and derivative anti-war film is being universally celebrated as a masterpiece, to Mort's chagrin. Mort quickly becomes jealous of Sue and Philippe's relationship, which increasingly moves into open flirtation. Mort's inner thoughts and fears causes him to have nightmares inspired by well-known black and white cinematic classics like Citizen Kane, Breathless, Jules and Jim, A Man and a Woman, Persona, Wild Strawberries, The Exterminating Angel, and 8½.

While at the festival, Mort reminisces about his life and the pretentious novel that he's been writing for decades, trying to achieve a literary relevance that eludes him. He reflects upon his younger years when he used to teach cinema at the university and felt happy and stimulated. Meanwhile, he's helpless to keep Sue and Philippe from spending time with each other. Eventually, he seeks medical advice about some chest pains and meets Joanna "Jo" Rojas, a Spanish doctor who spent some time in New York and is now unhappily married with an unfaithful, temperamental artist. Joanna leaves a lasting impression on Mort and he repeatedly tries to engage her attention by faking health issues. Eventually, the two go on a sight-seeing drive through the surrounding country, both having a good time in the process.

On their way back to town, a flat tire forces Joanna and Mort to hitchhike back to Joanna's home, where she discovers her husband cheating on her with one of his models. The two have a bitter fight, then Joanna takes Mort back to his hotel. Here, Sue confronts Mort about their deteriorating relationship, eventually announcing she's leaving him to start a new life with Philippe. The next morning, Mort calls Joanna, hoping to see her again before he has to return to New York, but she politely declines, despite harboring some affection for Mort and doubts about her own marriage's toxicity.

Finally, Mort imagines himself playing chess with Death in a parody of Ingmar Bergman's 1957 film The Seventh Seal. Death tells him that human life is ultimately meaningless, but doesn't need to be empty. In a parting word of advice, Death tells Mort that he will see him again in the future, but Mort might win some extra time by making sure to exercise and to avoid processed foods. As the festival reaches its closing day, Mort reflects upon his changed circumstances, pondering going back to being a teacher, this time with a less rigid attitude towards art. Back in New York, he asks his therapist what he should do now.

Cast

Production 
In February 2019, Amazon Studios dropped Allen from a five-picture deal to produce and finance films, following the revival of the sexual abuse allegations made against him in 1992. That month, it was announced Allen would write and direct the film, with Jaume Roures producing under his Mediapro banner. In June 2019, Gina Gershon, Christoph Waltz, Elena Anaya, Louis Garrel, Sergi López and Wallace Shawn joined the cast. In July 2020, Richard Kind announced he would appear in the film.

Filming 
Principal photography began July 10, 2019, in San Sebastián, Spain and ended on August 16, a week ahead of schedule.

Release 
In April 2020, Tripictures acquired distribution rights to the film in Spain. It had its world premiere at the 68th San Sebastián International Film Festival on September 18, 2020 and was released in Spain on October 2, 2020. It was previously scheduled to be released in Spain on September 25. It was scheduled to be released in Italy on November 5, 2020, by Vision Distribution, but it was postponed to May 6, 2021, due to the COVID-19 pandemic. On January 28, 2022, the film began a limited release in United States theaters and on streaming services.

Reception

Box office 
, the film has grossed $768,449 in Spain and $1.8 million worldwide (Spain, the Netherlands, Ukraine, Italy and Russia).

Critical reception 
Rifkin's Festival holds a 42% approval rating on review aggregator website Rotten Tomatoes, based on 79 reviews, and an average score of 5.30/10. The site's critical consensus reads: "While it doesn't rank among Woody Allen's truly lesser late-period efforts, Rifkin's Festival finds the filmmaker content to revisit well-worn territory." On Metacritic, it holds a weighted average score of 44 out of 100, based on 15 critics, indicating "mixed or average reviews".

Jonathan Romney of The Observer gave the film three stars out of five and stated, "In some ways, Rifkin’s Festival is absolutely familiar Allen territory, and, whatever else his detractors can or can’t accuse him of, there’s no way he’ll get off the charge of ploughing the same ground for the last couple of decades. Once again, he has made a brittle comedy about marital angst in a glamorous setting." Jessica Kiang of The New York Times commented, "So it’s a relief to report that “Rifkin’s Festival” is, to the ravenous captive, like finding an unexpected stash of dessert: not substantial and not nutritious, but sweet enough to remind you in passing of the good times you once had, despite all that's happened in the interim." Guy Lodge of Variety added, "His 49th feature, “Rifkin’s Festival” is the latest in a lengthy string of undistinguished bagatelles that might all be described as effortless, and not in an especially complimentary fashion."

In a less favorable review, Kaleem Aftab of IndieWire gave the movie a C grade, writing, " There's a strange meta quality to the way the movie drifts around, dipping in and out of a tepid plot. Of course, there's no surprise here. Like a lot of recent Allen movies, it's easy enough to figure out the intentions at hand early on." Chuck Bowen of Slant Magazine gave the film one star out of four, noting "Decades into his iconic career, Woody Allen is still fixated on wannabe intellectual artists obsessively grappling with the meaninglessness of life as they have dalliances with much younger women who’re yearning for passion. That scenario was curdling into shtick some 40 years ago, but it at least felt personal to Allen in his salad days, when he was determined to fuse the existential agony of the films made by his heroes with his own scrappy, impertinent stand-up spirit. Now Allen is seemingly filming whatever writing spills from his typewriter, which is more often than not a copy of a copy of a copy of past hits, material so anachronistic and contrived that it feels closer to ritual than art."

Accolades 

|-
| 2021
| 8th Feroz Awards
| Best Film Poster
| Jordi Labanda
| 
|

References

External links 
 

2020 films
2020 comedy films
American comedy films
Spanish comedy films
Italian comedy films
Films with screenplays by Woody Allen
Films directed by Woody Allen
Films produced by Letty Aronson
Films shot in Spain
English-language Spanish films
English-language Italian films
2020s English-language films
2020s Spanish films
2020s American films